Felimida ghanensis is a species of sea slug, a dorid nudibranch, a shell-less marine gastropod mollusk in the family Chromodorididae.

Distribution
This sponge-eating species is found in the Eastern Atlantic Ocean around Ghana, the Canary Islands and the Azores.

References

 Debelius, H. & Kuiter, R.H. (2007) Nudibranchs of the world. ConchBooks, Frankfurt, 360 pp.  page(s): 198
 Johnson R.F. & Gosliner T.M. (2012) Traditional taxonomic groupings mask evolutionary history: A molecular phylogeny and new classification of the chromodorid nudibranchs. PLoS ONE 7(4): e33479
"Felimida ghanensis Nudibranch". www.reeflex.net. Retrieved 20 June 2021.

External links
 Glossodoris ghanensis page at nudipixel

Chromodorididae
Gastropods described in 1968